Year 115 (CXV) was a common year starting on Monday (link will display the full calendar) of the Julian calendar. In the Roman Empire, it was known as the Year of the Consulship of Messalla and Vergilianus (or, less frequently, year 868 Ab urbe condita). The denomination 115 for this year has been used since the early medieval period, when the Anno Domini calendar era became the prevalent method in Europe for naming years.

Events

By place

Roman Empire 
 Emperor Trajan is cut off in southern Mesopotamia after his invasion of that region.
 Trajan captures the Parthian capital of Ctesiphon.
 Jews in Egypt and Cyrene ignite a revolt (Kitos War) against the rule of the Roman Empire, which spreads to Cyprus, Judea, and the Roman province of Mesopotamia.
 Alexandria in Egypt is destroyed during the Jewish-Greek civil wars. Marcus Rutilius Lupus, the Roman governor, sends Legio XXII Deiotariana to protect the inhabitants of Memphis.
 A revolt breaks out in Britain; the garrison at Eboracum (York) is massacred.
 The Pantheon of Agrippa is reconstructed in Rome.
 Lusius Quietus, Trajan's governor of Judea, begins a brutal campaign to maintain the peace in the region.

Asia 
 An earthquake destroys Apamea and Antioch in Syria. The local bishop is held responsible (he will be martyred and remembered as St. Ignatius).

By topic

Religion 
 Pope Sixtus I succeeds Alexander I as the seventh pope of Rome (according to Catholic biographies).

Births 
 Pausanias, Greek historian and geographer (d. 180)
 Shun of Han, Chinese emperor of the Han Dynasty  (d. 144)

Deaths 
 Alexander I, bishop of Rome (approximate date)
 Dio Chrysostom, Greek philosopher and historian (b. AD 40)

References